Houston County Airport may refer to:

 Perry-Houston County Airport in Houston County, Georgia, United States
 Houston County Airport (Minnesota) in Houston County, Minnesota, United States
 Houston County Airport (Tennessee) in Houston County, Tennessee, United States
 Houston County Airport (Texas) in Houston County, Texas, United States

See also
 Houston Airport (disambiguation)
 Houston International Airport (disambiguation)